Swans Lagoon is a locality in the Shire of Burdekin, Queensland, Australia.

History 
The locality was named and bounded on 23 February 2001. It presumably takes its name from the waterhole of the same name.

References 

Shire of Burdekin
Localities in Queensland